The Border Menace is a 1934 American western film directed by Robert F. Hill and starring Bill Cody, Miriam Rice, George Chesebro and Jimmy Aubrey  who also edited the film. It was produced by an independent Poverty Row outfit Aywon Film Corporation for release as a second feature. Location shooting took place at the Walker Ranch in Newhall, California.

Synopsis
A Ranger goes undercover as a cattle rustler, but the man he was in prison with to get his information breaks out and vows vengeance.

Cast
 Bill Cody as Ranger Bill "The Shadow" Williams
 Miriam Rice as Helen Millette
George Chesebro as	Chuck Adams
Jimmy Aubrey as Polecat Pete 
Ben Corbett as Dragon Morris
Frank Clark as Banker Harris
 James Donnelly as Old Man Millette

References

Bibliography
 Pitts, Michael R. Poverty Row Studios, 1929–1940. McFarland & Company, 2005.

External links
 

1934 films
1934 Western (genre) films
1930s English-language films
American Western (genre) films
Films directed by Jack Nelson
American black-and-white films
Films shot in California
1930s American films